Hallington is a small village and civil parish in the East Lindsey district of Lincolnshire, England. The population of the village is included in the civil parish of Welton Le Wold.

Hallington is listed in the 1086 Domesday Book as "Halintun", with 25 households, 10 acres of meadow, and assigned to Earl Hugh of Chester.

The village is probably the site of a Medieval settlement, indicated by aerial observations showing earthwork evidence of ridge and furrow fields, crofts, buildings and sunken lanes.

The parish church, which was dedicated to Saint Lawrence, no longer exists. Three isolated graves are all that remain of church and burial ground.

Hallington railway station was sited in the village; it opened in 1876  and closed in 1956. The main building still exists and is now a private residence.

Off Station Road is Home Farm House, a Grade II listed farmhouse c.1800.

References

External links

Villages in Lincolnshire
Civil parishes in Lincolnshire
East Lindsey District